Prem Deewane (Love Crazy) is a 1992 Indian Hindi-language film directed by Sachin Pilgaonkar and produced by Ashok Ghai. It stars Jackie Shroff, Madhuri Dixit, Vivek Mushran and Pooja Bhatt in pivotal roles.This movie Unofficial Remake in Bangladesh "Apaharan"

Plot 
Prem Deewane is a romantic comedy movie. Radha  and Manohar  love each other and want to get married, but Radha's dad  does not approve of their marriage as Manohar comes from a poor family. He instructs Radha not to leave the house, but Radha finds a way to escape and goes to Manohar's house. Anticipating more obstacles, they run away, guided by Radha's uncle Natwarlal . Natwarlal convinces them that they must kidnap a wealthy person and demand a big ransom and take the money to appease Radha's dad.

Radha and Manu meet Ashutosh  in college. They are college sweethearts who plan to elope and marry but cannot because they don't have money and Radha is still a minor. So they are helped by Radha’s uncle to abduct Ashutosh. But he is way smarter and kidnaps them instead. After spending time with him they come to know about Shivangi  his girlfriend who he has lost contact with. When Ashutosh's Dad goes to file a missing complaint the inspector in charge is Shivangi herself. Then it's a riot of laughter as Ashutosh, Radha and Manohar are running from police and Radha's uncle. When finally Shivangi catches up to them, Radha and Manohar plot to bring the two lovers together. That clears the misunderstanding between them and climax shows how Ashutosh's love is revealed to Shivangi, both couples are united with their families, and all's well.

Cast

 Jackie Shroff... Ashutosh 
 Madhuri Dixit... Shivangi Mehra
 Vivek Mushran... Manohar "Manu"
 Pooja Bhatt... Radha
 Bharat Bhushan... Shivangi's Father
 Jeet Bahadur... Natwarlal 
 Ashok Saraf... Shomu
 Prem Chopra Natwarlal
 Manohar Singh....Ashutosh Father

Soundtrack

References

External links

1990s Hindi-language films
1992 films
Films scored by Laxmikant–Pyarelal
Films directed by Sachin (actor)